John Decker Butzner Jr. (October 2, 1917 – January 20, 2006) was a United States circuit judge of the United States Court of Appeals for the Fourth Circuit and previously was a United States district judge of the United States District Court for the Eastern District of Virginia.

Education and career

Born on October 2, 1917, in Scranton, Pennsylvania, Butzner began to become interested in the law when, as a child, he visited his uncle Billy Butzner, an attorney. He received a Bachelor of Arts degree, magna cum laude, in 1938 from the University of Scranton and a Bachelor of Laws in 1941 from the University of Virginia School of Law, where he served on the board of editors of the Virginia Law Review. He entered private practice in Fredericksburg, Virginia from 1941 to 1942, with his uncle's firm of Butzner & Hicks. He was a United States Air Force staff sergeant in the Weather Service from 1942 to 1945, serving in Alaska, returning to private practice in Fredericksburg from 1946 to 1958. He served as an Associate Judge of the Virginia Circuit Court for the Fifteenth Judicial Circuit from 1958 to 1960. He served as a Judge of the Virginia Circuit Court for the Thirty-Ninth Judicial Circuit from 1960 to 1962.

Personal

Butzner's sister, Jane Jacobs, was a leading twentieth century urbanist and reformer. Butzner married Viola Peterson within two years of the end of his military service.

Federal judicial service

Butzner was nominated by President John F. Kennedy on May 15, 1962, to a seat on the United States District Court for the Eastern District of Virginia vacated by Judge Albert Vickers Bryan. He was confirmed by the United States Senate on June 15, 1962, and received his commission on June 20, 1962. His service terminated on August 1, 1967, due to elevation to the Fourth Circuit.

Butzner was nominated by President Lyndon B. Johnson on June 27, 1967, to a seat on the United States Court of Appeals for the Fourth Circuit vacated by Judge J. Spencer Bell. He was confirmed by the Senate on July 31, 1967, and received his commission on July 31, 1967. He assumed senior status on November 1, 1982. He took inactive senior status in 2000. His service terminated on January 20, 2006, due to his death in Richmond, Virginia, after a lengthy illness.

Kenneth Starr

Butzner served on the three-judge panel that appointed Kenneth W. Starr as independent counsel investigating Bill Clinton. He was interviewed by Ken Gormley for his 2010 book on the Clinton scandals. Janet Maslin of the New York Times, in her review of the book, says "Breathing with the help of an oxygen tube and with his speech severely impaired, Judge Butzner is able to utter only one complete sentence: 'I was against Starr, from start to finish.'"

Honor

In 1976, Butzner received the Distinguished Service Award from the Virginia Trial Lawyers Association.

References

Sources
 

1917 births
2006 deaths
Politicians from Fredericksburg, Virginia
University of Scranton alumni
University of Virginia School of Law alumni
Virginia lawyers
Judges of the United States District Court for the Eastern District of Virginia
United States district court judges appointed by John F. Kennedy
20th-century American judges
Judges of the United States Court of Appeals for the Fourth Circuit
United States court of appeals judges appointed by Lyndon B. Johnson
Politicians from Scranton, Pennsylvania
United States Army Air Forces soldiers
United States Army personnel of World War II
Virginia circuit court judges